Dhanunjaya Gotra is a Kshatriya Gotra in 
India, Rangoon, Andhra Pradesh, Telangana, Tamil Nadu Uttar Pradesh, Bihar, belonging to Suryavamsham

Kshatriya surnames of Districts in Andhra Pradesh (West Godavari,East Godavari, Vizianagaram, Visakhapatnam Districts). Dhanunjaya gotra descends from Eastern Chalukya & Kota vamsa.

Kshatriya Dhanunjaya Gotra Surnames
Addala
Bhupathiraju
Bairagi
Bairraju
Chalamagunta
Champati
Chekuri
Cherukuri
Chinthalapati
Danthuluri
Dandu
Datla
Epuri
Madhala
Petchetti
Rudraraju
Revuri
Kanteti
Kantheti
Keertipati/ Keerthipati
Konduri 
Kunaparaju
Kusampudi
Kunchapu
Tirumalaraju
Gottumukkala
Gokaraju
Jampana
Addhepalli
Adluru
Dasararaju / Dasariraju 
Guntimadugu / Guntumadugu
Gunturi
Jampana
sakiraju
Shetty Rajulu (Rangoon)
Keerthipati
Nallaparaju
Nandimandalam 
penmethsa
Pakalapati
Sagiraju
Somalaraju / Somalraju
Suraparaju
Vadderaju
Vempalle
Vegiraju
Vetukuri
Varadaraju
Viswaraju
Yellamraju
Yarakaraju
thotakura

Origins

The Maharaja of Vizianagram is descended from the Ranas of Udaipur, one of the most ancient, and, in popular estimation, most illustrious families in India. He is consequently of the Grahilot tribe; and speaks of himself as belonging to the Sisodia branch, and of the Vasisht gotra. According to the traditions of this famous house, Bijaibhup, one of its members, at a very early period, settled in Ajudhiya, the modern Oudh, whence, in the year 514 of the Saka era, corresponding to 592 A.D., his descendant, Madhavavarma, emigrated to the Telingana country, accompanied by representatives of the Vasisht, Dhanunjaya, Kaundinya, Kasyap, and Bharaddwaj gotras of his own tribe.

References

Gotras